Fiona Kolbinger (born 24 May 1995) is a German ultra-endurance cyclist and medical doctor. She was the winner of the Transcontinental Race in 2019  winning in a time of 10 days 2 hours and 48 minutes with an advance of more than ten hours over the second closest, Ben Davies. She was the first woman to ever win the race, beating a field of over 224 men and 40 women.

Fiona Kolbinger studied medicine at Heidelberg University and is an alumna of the German Cancer Research Center, where she was a doctoral student in the field of paediatric oncology.

Since 2019, she is a surgical resident at the Department for Visceral, Thoracic and Vascular Surgery at the University Hospital, Technical University Dresden. 

She was recognized as one of the BBC's 100 women of 2019.

References

1995 births
Living people
German female cyclists
BBC 100 Women
Sportspeople from Bonn
Heidelberg University alumni
Cyclists from North Rhine-Westphalia
German vascular surgeons
Physicians from North Rhine-Westphalia
20th-century German women
21st-century German women